Kannusamy Venkatapathy (born 15 June 1946) is a member of the 14th Lok Sabha of India. He represents the Cuddalore constituency of Tamil Nadu and is a member of the Dravida Munnetra Kazhagam (DMK) political party.

He was Minister of State in the Ministry of Law and Justice from 2004.

References

Living people
Indian Tamil people
1946 births
India MPs 2004–2009
Union ministers of state of India
Dravida Munnetra Kazhagam politicians
Union Ministers from Tamil Nadu
Lok Sabha members from Tamil Nadu
People from Cuddalore district